The 1983 Borno State gubernatorial election occurred on August 13, 1983. NPN candidate Asheik Jarma won the election.

Results
Asheik Jarma representing NPN won the election. The election held on August 13, 1983.

References 

Borno State gubernatorial elections
Borno State gubernatorial election
Borno State gubernatorial election